Ficus calyptroceras is a species of fig in the family Moraceae, in Brazil.

Description
The tree is endemic to Brazil, in the states of Bahia, Goiás, Minas Gerais, Mato Grosso do Sul, and Piauí.

It is an IUCN Red List Vulnerable species, threatened by habitat loss.

References

External links
 Current IUCN Red List of All Threatened Species

calyptroceras
Endemic flora of Brazil
Trees of Brazil
Flora of Bahia
Flora of Goiás
Flora of Minas Gerais
Environment of Mato Grosso do Sul
Environment of Piauí
Vulnerable flora of South America
Taxonomy articles created by Polbot
Taxa named by Friedrich Anton Wilhelm Miquel